The Digital Transgender Archive (DTA) is an online resource based at Northeastern University in Boston, Massachusetts, in collaboration with more than sixty international colleges, universities, nonprofit organizations, and private collections. It was established to enable researchers to locate and make use of transgender-related materials in digital and physical collections. It serves as a finding aid for archival materials and an online hub for born-digital materials and digitized historical materials. According to the archive's website: "In order to address these significant barriers to the accessibility of trans history, the DTA virtually merges disparate archival collections, digital materials, and independent projects with a single search engine. With rich primary source materials and powerful search tools, the DTA offers a generative point of entry into the fascinating and expansive world of trans history."

Purpose 
The DTA co-locates and provides direct access or links to materials from numerous institutions including (but not limited to) Canadian Lesbian and Gay Archives, GLBT Historical Society, Leather Archives and Museum, Transgender Oral History Project, University of Wisconsin–Milwaukee, and ONE National Gay & Lesbian Archives in order to assist researchers in overcoming several challenges in conducting research into transgender history. Materials documenting transgender history are widely dispersed, and the level of description and access for materials varies widely. The creation of this resource makes available materials that were previously unavailable online or very difficult to find in archival collections.  Because the term transgender is relatively new, materials processed in archives prior to the 1990s may not contain the now widely accepted descriptive term, so this digital repository seeks to bridge that gap. The DTA contains over 8,500 items, including newsletters, periodicals, photographs, and zines, and—according to one of the originators of the project—"anything related to 'trans-ing gender.'" By digitally merging materials from multiple institutions world-wide, access is greatly increased.

Awards 
Associate Professor K.J. Rawson, Project Director of the DTA, received a Digital Innovation Fellowship and subsequent $150,000 Digital Extension Grant from the American Council of Learned Societies for work on the DTA. In 2017, the digital repository received the C.F.W. Coker Award from the Society of American Archivists, which honors "finding aids, finding aid systems, innovative development in archival description, or descriptive tools that enable archivists to produce more effective finding aids".

See also 
Transgender history
Transgender rights

References

External links
 Digital Transgender Archive

College of the Holy Cross
Transgender organizations in the United States
Archives in the United States
LGBT museums and archives
Northeastern University